Calytrix glutinosa is a species of plant in the myrtle family Myrtaceae that is endemic to Western Australia.

It usually blooms between August and December producing white-pink-purple star-shaped flowers.

Found on hillsides and among granite outcrops in the Mid West and Wheatbelt regions extending into the Swan Coastal Plain of Western Australia where it grows on sandy or clay soils over granite, laterite and sandstone.
 
The species was first formally described by the botanist John Lindley in 1839 in the work A Sketch of the Vegetation of the Swan River Colony. The only synonym is Calycothrix glutinosa, described in 1843 by Johannes Conrad Schauer in the work Monographia Myrtacearum Xerocarpicarum.

References

Plants described in 1839
glutinosa
Flora of Western Australia